The 2004 New Hampshire gubernatorial election occurred on November 2, 2004, concurrent with that year's presidential election. Democrat John Lynch, a multimillionaire businessman from Hopkinton, narrowly defeated incumbent Republican Governor Craig Benson of Rye, winning a two-year term. Benson was the first New Hampshire governor in 78 years to lose reelection after one term. Lynch was sworn in on January 6, 2005.

To date, Benson is the most recent incumbent governor to lose reelection in any New England state.

Democratic primary

Candidates
John Lynch, businessman and University System of New Hampshire Trustee
Paul McEachern, perennial candidate

Results

Republican primary

Candidates
Craig Benson, incumbent Governor of New Hampshire
Charles Tarbell, New Castle Selectman

Results

General election

Predictions

Results

See also
 U.S. Gubernatorial Elections, 2004
 New Hampshire gubernatorial election, 2006

References

External links
 New Hampshire Secretary of State's office, election division

2004 United States gubernatorial elections
2004
Gubernatorial